Nilo may refer to:

 Nilo (name)
 Nilo, Cundinamarca, a town in Colombia

See also 
 Nilo-Saharan languages
 Nilo Rukundpur, a village in Patepur Tehsil, Vaishali, Bihar, India
 Nilo Syrtis, a region just north of Syrtis Major Planum on Mars
 Nile (disambiguation)